Live 1990 is a 1993 live album released by a reformed line-up of Canterbury scene band Hatfield and the North. This marked the band's first manifestation since its 1975 break-up. Original keyboard player Dave Stewart declined to take part and was replaced by French jazz pianist Sophia Domancich, at the time a member of drummer Pip Pyle's band Equip'Out. This line-up's activity was limited to this one appearance on Central TV's "Bedrock" series. In addition to a number of tracks from the band's classic repertoire, a large part of the concert was devoted to more recent material. This was to be Hatfield's swan song until the 2005–06 reformation.

Track listing 

"Share It" (Sinclair, Pyle)
"Shipwrecked" (Pyle)
"Underdub" (Miller)
"Blott on the Landscape" (Domancich)
"Going for a Song" (Sinclair, Pyle)
"Cauliflower Ears" (Pyle)
"Halfway Between Heaven and Earth" (Sinclair)
"5/4 Intro" (Sinclair)
"Didn't Matter Anyway" (Sinclair)

Personnel 

Musicians

 Sophia Domancich – keyboards
 Phil Miller – guitar
 Richard Sinclair – bass, vocals
 Pip Pyle – drums

Production

 Will Ashurst – executive producer
 Duncan Smith – executive producer

Recorded in Nottingham, 30 March 1990.
This was taken from a video shoot at a TV studio that also hosted a Gong Reunion around the same time.

References

External links 
 Hatfield and the North - Live 1990 (1993) album review by Stewart Mason, credits & releases at AllMusic
 Hatfield and the North - Live 1990 (1993) album releases & credits at Discogs
 Hatfield and the North - Live 1990 (1993) album to be listened as stream on Spotify

Hatfield and the North albums
1993 live albums